The Democratic Party for Progress – Angolan National Alliance (Partido Democrático para o Progresso – Aliança Nacional Angolana) is a political party in Angola. The party was founded in Luanda, March 17, 1991. It was led by Mfulumpinga Landu Victor, a former National Liberation Front of Angola (FNLA) cadre and Member of Parliament for the PDP-ANA, until he was shot dead outside the party office in 2004. It is now led by Francisco Lele.

In the 2008 legislative elections, it gained 0.51% of the vote and no seats in the National Assembly.

Sources

External links 
 "Angola: Opposition PPDA Backs Agenda Proposed By Ruling Party" Angola Press, 26 December 2006

Political parties in Angola